Hokkien architecture, also called Hoklo architecture or Minnan architecture, refers to the architectural style of the Hoklo people, the Han Chinese group who have historically been the dominant demographic of the Southern Chinese province of Fujian (called "Hokkien" in the Hoklo language), Taiwan, and Singapore. This style shares many similarities with those of surrounding Han Chinese groups. There are, however, several features that are unique or mostly unique to Hoklo-made buildings, making many traditional buildings in Hokkien and Taiwan visually distinctive from those outside the region.

Minyue architecture
Prior to the annexation of the Minyue Kingdom by the Han dynasty, the region was inhabited by the Minyue people, a branch of the Baiyue aboriginals. The Minyue State's Imperial City (Traditional Chinese: 閩越王城遺址) gave some clues about what their architectural style was like.

Swallowtail roof

Swallowtail roof (Pe̍h-ōe-jī: ìnn-bé-tsiah; Traditional Chinese: 燕尾脊, literally "swallowtail ridge") is a feature rarely (if at all) seen in non-Hoklo Han Chinese architecture. It is very common in Hokkien and Taiwan. The term refers to a roof that has an upward-curving ridge shaped like the tail of a swallow. The degree of curving may vary. The "swallowtail" in question can be single- or double-layered and is typically decorated with a large amount of colorful carvings. This feature originated in 16th century (Ming Dynasty). At that time, Hoklo people were  doing business with Southeast Asia, Taiwan, Ryukyu (Ryūkyū-kan) and Japan, and decided that they would like to show off their newfound wealth - resulting in this garish architectural style. Due to its bright and showy nature, this architectural feature is commonly found in major temples, mansions, and ancestral halls.

Cut porcelain carving
Cut porcelain carving (Pe̍h-ōe-jī: Tsián-huî-tiau; Traditional Chinese: 剪瓷雕, literally "cut porcelain carving") is also prevalent among Hoklo architecture and, to a lesser extent, Vietnamese architecture. Traditionally, Hoklo porcelain artists would often gather small colored porcelain artifacts (such as bowls and other eating utensils), cut and/or grind them into smaller fragments, and then paste these fragments onto sculptures attached to buildings for the purpose of decoration. This art is frequently used on the ridges, window frames, and doors of temples and larger residences, often in conjunction with swallowtail roof. The topic of these sculptures may vary - ranging from plants and animals to figures from Chinese mythology or Hoklo folktales. In Taiwan, a new style has even been formed by combining cut porcelain carving with cochin ware.

Hokkien Sanheyuan

Sanheyuan (Pe̍h-ōe-jī: Sam-ha̍h-īnn; Traditional Chinese: 三合院, literally "Three-combo building") is a type of building found throughout most of the Greater China region. They are residences with structures on three sides of a courtyard, forming an inverted U-shape. While this style is shared by nearly all Han Chinese groups, Hokkien Sanheyuan have been noted by their usage of multiple wings (called "protecting dragons" in Taiwan) to spread outward, a trait quite distinctive to Hoklo Sanheyuan.

Têng-á-kha
Têng-á-kha (Pe̍h-ōe-jī: Têng-á-kha; Traditional Chinese: 亭仔跤) is a style of architecture found in much of Southern China and is considered the Hokkien counterpart to the Cantonese tong lau. It is a style that incorporates elements from Western European architecture, arising slowly in late 18th century due to the Hokkien contact with Western European culture in Southeast Asia. A typical têng-á-kha has a ground floor used for running some sort of business (such as a grocery store) and upper floors that are used for residential purposes. Amoy's têng-á-khas are said to be marked by having pink and white as main colorings, use of streets full of têng-á-khas such as markets, and the distribution of têng-á-khas in net-like structures. The city of Chinchew has also been noted for having a well-preserved set of têng-á-khas.

Others

Hokkien earthen buildings

Hokkien earthen buildings (Pe̍h-ōe-jī: Hok-kiàn thóo-lâu; Traditional Chinese: 福建土樓, literally "Hokkien earthen building"), called "Fujian Tulou" in Mandarin Chinese, is another distinct type of architecture found in the Hokkien region. It is a set of large, enclosed and fortified earth buildings associated with the Hakka people, who speak the Hakka language, rather than Hoklo. However, it has been noted that this style of architecture is found almost exclusively among Hakka people in Fujian province and thus has become associated with the region.

In Modern Architecture

See also
 Architecture of Taiwan
 Architecture of Singapore
 Cantonese architecture
 Hakka architecture
 Architecture of Jiangxi
 Chinese architecture

References

Bibliography
 

Minnan architecture
Architecture in China
Chinese architectural styles

News articles